The Little River is a  stream in Carlton County, Minnesota, United States. It is a tributary of the Saint Louis River.

See also
List of rivers of Minnesota

References

Minnesota Watersheds
USGS Hydrologic Unit Map - State of Minnesota (1974)

Rivers of Minnesota
Rivers of Carlton County, Minnesota